For the Learning of Mathematics is a triannual peer-reviewed academic journal covering mathematics education. It was established in 1981 by David Wheeler.

Abstracting and indexing
The journal is abstracted and indexed in:
EBSCO databases
Education Resources Information Center
Index Islamicus
ProQuest databases
Scopus

Reception
In 2012, a survey of researchers in the field ranked the journal with an A (the second highest ranking, below A*). In 2017, another ranking of journals placed it in the top tier. At the same time, the high ranking in both of these reviews was questioned, suggesting that the journal more properly belongs in the mid-tier.

Editors-in-chief
The following persons are or have been editor-in-chief:
David Wheeler (1981–1996)
David Pimm (1997–2002)
Laurinda Brown (2003–2007)
Brent Davis (2008–2010)
Richard Barwell (2011–2016)
David Reid (2017–present)

See also
 List of mathematics education journals

References

External links
 

Publications established in 1981
Mathematics education journals
Multilingual journals
Triannual journals
Delayed open access journals